The medal was dedicated to the 95th anniversary of the Armed Forces of the Azerbaijan Democratic Republic in that was established in 1918. It was designed in accordance with the order of the President of Azerbaijan Ilham Aliyev dated October 16, 2012.

The military personals including warrant officers, ensigns, retired officers (released or reserve) who served in the Armed Forces of the Republic of Azerbaijan actively contributed to the formation and strengthening of the Armed Forces of the Republic of Azerbaijan until June 26, 2008 are awarded the medal.

The medal is worn on the left side of the chest, and in the presence of other orders and medals, it is attached after the medal "90th anniversary of the Armed Forces of the Republic of Azerbaijan (1918-2008)".

The description of the Medal 
"95th Anniversary of Azerbaijani Armed Forces (1918-2013)" Jubilee Medal is a round shaped medal that made of bronze with 35mm diameter and plated with gold ornaments.

The ribbon on the right side of the face of the medal is located at the center and colored with National Flag of the Republic of Azerbaijan. In the upper part of the ribbon "Armed Forces of the Republic of Azerbaijan", and in the bottom "95 years" were inscribed.

Bas-relief of Heydar Aliyev is portrayed on the left side and below the bas relief are the years "1918" and "2013" in two lines. On the obverse, an inscription "Republic of Azerbaijan" written at the top and "Armed Forces" at the bottom.

References 

Orders, decorations, and medals of Azerbaijan
Awards established in 2012
2012 establishments in Azerbaijan